Ignacio Tapia is the name of:

Ignacio Tapia (footballer, born 1999), Chilean footballer
Ignacio Tapia (footballer, born 2004), Argentine footballer